Grimwood is a surname. Notable people with the surname include:

 Alfred Grimwood (1905–1986), English cricketer
 Jane Grimwood, British microbiologist
 John Grimwood (1898–1977), English footballer
 Jon Courtenay Grimwood (born 1953), science fiction and fantasy author
 Keith Grimwood, member of the band Trout Fishing in America
 Ken Grimwood (1944–2003), American author
 Liam Grimwood, English archer 
 Terry Grimwood, British author of science fiction and horror
 Trevor Grimwood (born 1948), Australian footballer

Fictional characters
 DS Grimwood, a character in the soap opera EastEnders

See also
 Grimwood's longclaw, Congolese bird